European Spring may refer to:
 The European Revolutions of 1848
 The European Revolutions of 1989
 European Spring, Spanish electoral alliance for the European Parliament election in 2014
 European Spring, political party and electoral alliance linked to DieM25 for the European Parliament election in 2019